Phaecasiophora euchlanis is a moth of the family Tortricidae. It is found in Vietnam.

The wingspan is 26 mm. The ground colour of the forewings is cream with a slight yellowish-brown admixture. The suffusions and small dots are brownish and the costal strigulae (fine streaks) are fine, indistinct and creamish. The markings are pale. The hindwings are pale cream brown.

Etymology
The specific epithet refers to the colouration of the forewing and is derived from Greek euchlana (meaning a thin overcoat).

References

Moths described in 2009
Olethreutini
Moths of Asia
Taxa named by Józef Razowski